Papaipema sciata, or  Culver's root borer moth, is a species of moth found in North America, where it has been recorded from Connecticut, Maine, New York, New Jersey, Iowa, Michigan, Missouri, Minnesota, Illinois, and Wisconsin. It is listed as a species of special concern and believed extirpated in the US state of Connecticut. The species was first described by Henry Bird in 1908.

The wingspan is about 40 mm. Adults are similar to Papaipema limpida, but may be distinguished by the pattern of white spots on the forewings. The hindwings are light chocolate brown.

The larvae feed on Veronicastrum virginicum. They bore the roots of their host plant.

References

sciata
Moths described in 1908